Sir Robert Fitzwygram, 2nd Baronet, FRS (25 September 1773 – 17 December 1843), born Robert Wigram, was a Director of the Bank of England and a Tory politician.

Early life
Fitzwygram was the eldest son of Lady Eleanor and Sir Robert Wigram, 1st Baronet, merchant and shipbuilder of Walthamstow. Among his numerous brothers were Joseph Cotton Wigram, Bishop of Rochester, Loftus Wigram, George Wigram, and Octavius Wigram, prominent in the City of London as a member of Lloyd's of London and as Governor of the Royal Exchange Assurance Company.

Career
Fitzwygram owned a number of South Sea whaling ships in partnership with his father. Wigram was interested in the foundation of the London Institution in 1805.

Political career
He followed his father into Parliament in 1806 as Member of Parliament for Fowey. He was a Director of the Bank of England, and a Fellow of the Royal Society, and was knighted on 7 May 1818. In 1829 he was elected for the Wexford Borough but was unseated on petition. He was re-elected in 1830, but was again unseated in petition in 1831. He inherited the Wigram Baronetcy on the death of his father in 1830. In 1832 by royal licence, he changed his surname to FitzWygram.

Personal life

In 1812, Wigram married Selina Hayes, youngest daughter of Sir John Macnamara Hayes Bt and Anne ( White) Hayes. Together, they were the parents of:

 Robert Fiztwygram Wigram (1813–1873), who inherited the baronetcy but died unmarried.
 Selina Frances Fitzwygram (1815–1890), who died unmarried.
 Eleanor Maria Fitzwygram (1816–1817), who died young.
 George Augustus Frederick Fitzwygram (1818–1841), who died unmarried.
 Augusta Catherine Fitzwygram (1819–1893), who married Sir George Baker, 3rd Baronet.
 Sophia Matilda Fitzwygram (1820–1824), who died young.
 Frederick Wellington John Fitzwygram (1823–1904), who married Angela Frances Mary Vaughan, daughter of Thomas Nugent Vaughan and a younger half-sister of George Forbes, 7th Earl of Granard, in 1882.
 William Harcourt Fitzwygram (1825–1832), who died young.
 John Fitzroy Wigram (1827–1881), a Reverend who married Alice Ward, daughter of Sir Henry George Ward, in 1866.
 Cordelia Anne Fitzwygram (1829–1830), who died young.
 Loftus Adam Fitzwygram (1832–1904), who married Lady Frances Butler-Danvers, daughter of Hon. Charles Augustus Butler-Danvers and sister of John Butler, 6th Earl of Lanesborough, in 1866.

Upon his death, his eldest son Robert inherited the baronetcy but died without issue. The baronetcy then passed to Fitzwygram's third son, Frederick.

Arms

References

Notes

Sources

1773 births
1843 deaths
Baronets in the Baronetage of the United Kingdom
Members of the Parliament of the United Kingdom for County Wexford constituencies (1801–1922)
UK MPs 1806–1807
UK MPs 1807–1812
UK MPs 1812–1818
UK MPs 1826–1830
UK MPs 1830–1831
Fellows of the Royal Society
Members of the Parliament of the United Kingdom for constituencies in Cornwall
British people in whaling